The  was a professional golf tournament on the Japan Golf Tour. It was played annually from 1994 to 2014 on the Yamanohara Course at Yamanohara Golf Club, formerly Sports Shinko Country Club, near Kawanishi, Hyōgo.

The tournament scoring records of 265 (−19) were set by Tomohiro Kondo in 2011. In its final year in 2014, the purse was ¥110,000,000 with ¥22,000,000 going to the winner.

Winners

External links
Coverage on the Japan Golf Tour's official site

Former Japan Golf Tour events
Defunct golf tournaments in Japan
Sport in Hyōgo Prefecture
Recurring sporting events established in 1994
Recurring sporting events disestablished in 2014